The Cave Singers is an American band from Seattle, Washington. Composed of former members of Pretty Girls Make Graves after its disbandment in 2007, former PGMG-member Derek Fudesco teamed up with Pete Quirk (of Hint Hint) and Marty Lund (of Cobra High) and began playing in the Seattle area. Soon after the band's conception, The Cave Singers signed with Matador Records on June 11, 2007. The band spent time recording in Vancouver with music engineer Colin Stewart, who quickly produced the band's first full-length LP. The band released the limited edition single 7" "Seeds Of Night" including b side "After The First Baptism" on August 2, 2007. Invitation Songs, the first LP, was released on September 25, 2007 to critical acclaim. The second single, "Dancing On Our Graves", was released on February 25, 2008.

On August 18, 2009, The Cave Singers released their second album, Welcome Joy, featuring guest appearances from Amber and Ashley Webber of the band Lightning Dust. Matador Records gave away a free download of the track "Beach House" to fans.

The Cave Singers signed to Jagjaguwar on June 15, 2010. The label released their third LP, No Witch, on February 22, 2011.

Personnel
 Pete Quirk – vocals, guitar, melodica, harmonica
 Derek Fudesco – guitar, bass pedals
 Marty Lund – drums, guitar
 Morgan Henderson  -Bass, flute

Discography

Albums
 Invitation Songs - Matador (2007)
 Welcome Joy - Matador (2009)
 No Witch - Jagjaguwar (2011)
 Naomi - Jagjaguwar (2013)
 Banshee - Self-released (2016)

Singles
"Seeds of Night" - Matador (2007)
"Dancing on Our Graves" - Matador (2008)
"Swim Club" - Jagjaguwar (2011)

References

External links

 Matador Records: Artist biography
 MySpace Page: The Cave Singers
 Three Imaginary Girls: Invitation Songs Record Review
 November 2007 Interview with L.A. Record
 Jagjaguwar: Cave Singers Artist Site

Indie rock musical groups from Washington (state)
Musical groups from Seattle
Jagjaguwar artists